The Jola or Diola (endonym: Ajamat) are an ethnic group found in Senegal, the Gambia, and Guinea-Bissau. Most Jola live in small villages scattered throughout Senegal, especially in the Lower Casamance region. The main dialect of the Jola language, Fogni, is one of the six national languages of Senegal.

Their economy has been based on wet rice cultivation for at least one thousand years. This system has been characterized "one of the most significant examples of 'agrarian civilizations' in West Africa". However, the Jola probably reached the Lower Casamance region in the 14th century, assimilating the previous Bainuk people and their rice tradition. In colonial times, the Jola began to cultivate peanuts as a cash crop in the drier forests. Other activities include palm wine tapping, honey collecting, livestock rearing and the production of other crops such as sweet potatoes, yams and watermelon.

The traditional religion of the Jola is animism, which is practised through fetishistic rituals and ceremonies. However, the Jola populations living in well-connected areas have become Islamized due to the influence of the nearby Mandinka people. As a result, many Jola no longer speak their own language and more than half are now Muslims. Unlike the dominant cultures of West Africa, most Jola communities lack any social or political stratification, being organized into families or neighborhoods. However, some communities have a central authority, a King, whose role resembles more that of a priest than of a traditional secular leader. The most prominent Jola Kingdom is in Oussouye. Among the Muslim Jola, there is also the Marabout, a religious leader and teacher. Traditional animist rituals are overseen by elders, who have an important role in Jola society. For Jola boys to attain manhood, they must take part in the initiation festival known as futamp, which takes place every 15 to 20 years in every Jola village.

Name
The word 'Jola' is the Mandinka name for this ethnic group and means 'payback', since Jolas are renowned for doing back what's been done to them, be it a good or a bad deed. The name of the Jola tribe in their own language is Ajamat (singular) or Ajamataw (plural). 'Diola' is the traditional transliteration in French, which is also very common in English sources.

Language and subgroups
The Jola speak the Jola language, which is divided into a variety of dialects which may not, at times, be mutually intelligible. These dialects correspond to the different Jola tribes:

 Banjaal spoken in a small area south of the Casamance River.
 Bayot spoken around Ziguinchor.
 KuDiola spoken in a handful of villages south of Oussouye.
 Fogni (Kujamaat) spoken around Bignona.
 Gusilay spoken in the village of Thionck Essyl.
 Karon spoken along the coast of Casamance south of Diouloulou.
 Kasa spoken around Oussouye.
 Kuwaataay spoken along the coast south of the Casamance River.
 Mlomp spoken in the village of Mlomp.

Religion
Overall, more than half of Jolas (54%) are Muslims. In Gambia, 90% of Jolas are Muslims. Some Jolas continue to follow their traditional religion and rituals in spite of  the influence of Islam and Christianity in recent times. Even though some accepted Islam after the Soninke-Marabout war, they honour the traditional use of palm wine in their rituals. They have one God that they associate with the natural phenomena like sky, rain, and the year, Emit or Ata Emit, literally, "To Whom Belongs The Universe" or "The Master-Owner Of The Universe". They have charms and sacred precincts that they honour and with which they communicate (but do not worship). The Jola people believe that spirits called Bakin or Eneerti (Mandinka Jalang) can protect their families, their villages, and their rice fields; and can even protect them from conversion to Islam and Christianity.

Before the influence of Islam and Christianity in their ways of beliefs, all Jolas placed great respect in the proper observation of funeral ceremony, and still today some do, for they are of the belief that it enables the dead person's soul to go to its final destination to join his or her ancestors. It was and still is strongly accepted by those Jolas who still practice their ancestral religion that without performing these funeral sacred rites, the soul is prevented from entering the presence of the creator (Ata Amit), and the ancestors. Jolas believed strongly in living a good humanistic life in this world. They believe that if one lives a bad life in this world, when the person dies the soul of the dead person is punished to become an exile spirit with no bed to lie on. In the Jola Cassa subgroup this exile spirit is called a Holowa. This exile spirit becomes a roaming spirit with no respect from the other spirits.

Some Jola religious festivals include the Samay, Kumpo and Niasse.

Culture

Unlike most ethnic groups of the Senegambian region, the Jola do not have caste system of Jewels griots, slaves, nobility, leather workers, etc. Their communities are based on extended clan settlements normally large enough to be given independent names, including the Jola Karon, Jola Mlomp, Jola Elinnkin, Jola Caginol, Jola Huluf, Jola Jamat, Jola Joheyt, Jola Bayot, Jola Brin, Jola Seleky, Jola Kabrouse, Jola Jiwat, and Jola Foni.  Jolas are also able herbal medicine practitioners. Their high adaptation to the nature and environment allowed them to be able to create musical centred civilisation, natural medicine centred civilisation, and most important of all, rice cultivation centred civilisation which they do effectively by using a locally made farming tool called the kajando.

Like some of the other the indigenous ethnic groups of the Senegambian region—the Baga, the Balanta, the Konyagi, etc.—, the Jola ethnic group did not develop a political scale that expanded beyond village level compared to ethnic groups that migrated to the region like the Sonike and the Mandinka. But this does not mean they did not develop a sophisticated political system. The egalitarian nature of their societies (rare in most societies), structured around the limited village environment gave them the possibilities to develop a political system based on collective consciousness, which they worked through their initiation rites. In a sense the Jolas' political achievement in the village was socialism. It was totally tied to their religious belief in the Bakin. This political achievement is not easy to reach if the society that runs it does not have well-defined rules of administration and penalties. Jolas have many traditional economic activities like fishing, farming groundnuts, tapping palm wine, and processing palm oil: their most intensive economic activity is rice cultivation, which is tied closely to their religion and social organization. Jolas are also palm oil manufacturers and palm wine tappers in the Senegambian region. They farm cows, pigs, goats, chickens, sheep and ducks. Jola crafts include basket weaving, pottery, and building.

Elders are considered very important in Jola society and are believed to possess occult powers and guard societal traditions. In villages, a council of elders make many of the daily decisions for the community and exert much influence. Despite the patriarchal nature of Jola society, many women played major roles in the community and were often members in village councils, religious leaders, and landowners. Women are also important as cultivators of wet rice fields in which they predominated. Polygamy and genital mutilation are not practiced by the Jola although outside influence has made these more common in certain villages.

Music

Ekonting

The ekonting is a three-string gourd instrument, the folk lute of the Jola people. It has an internal pass through body dowel stick with a round gourd body and its sound box is made of a hemispherical calabash, with a nailed goatskin. Before the invention of nails, palm tree thorns or wood pegs were used as nails. The three strings, which are attached to a long neck, today are nylon fishing line. Before, they were made of palm tree roots. The neck is a bamboo stick that passes through the calabash to the other side. A hole is made in the sound box to allow the sound to escape. The bridge of the ekonting is not fixed to its skin as many lutes are. It is free, and can be moved back and forth on the skin of the sound box and it is always held in position by the pressure of the strings when it is in playing position.

Galire

The galire is a one-string instrument of the Jola of Thionck-Essyl, with its strings stretched across a single 1 meter curve made of fine mangrove wood. At first sight, it looks like a hunter's bow. It's played with one hand holding a flexible fine string (made of palm leaves) beating on the arc's string, while the other hand holds one end of the arc and adjusts the tune with the thumb. The  other end of the arc rests in the mouth of the player, who sings. The vibration from the player's song on the string of the arc and the beating with the fine flexible string leads to the pleasant and characteristic sound of the galire.

The exile of young people to cities has led to the stark decline in usage of this traditional instrument among the Jola people of Casamance and the Gambia.

Other musical instruments
Below is a list of few Jola instruments. Note: The Jola language of Thionck Essyl is used to name them. Their names may differ somewhat in other villages' languages.
 Bakiti: like two maracas without the handle attached with one cord
 Bougarabou
 Ediando: used by the women during initiation dances
 Efemme: a calebasse reversed in a container full of water. Used by woman to improvise for or replace a drum when it's raining.
 Elere
 Emombi: used only during initiation - sacred and rarely seen - once each 20 to 30 years
 Etantang: used for Koumpo dance and wrestling festivities
 Ewang: used during male initiation
 Fouindoum: drum used during initiation
 Gabilene: sound make with a horn of an animal

History

Early history

These megaliths were built by the ancestors of the Serer people or of the Jola.

The Serer and Jola people believe in a common ancestry and have a  joking relationship with each other which they assign to their ancient shared cultural heritage. According to the legend of Jambooñ and Againe (an ancient Serer and Jola legend), two sisters boarded a pirogue with their parties. Due to act of nature, the pirogue broke into half at the Point of Sangomar. Those who headed south became the ancestors of the Jola (descendants of Agaire) and those who headed north became the ancestors of the Serer people (descendants of Jambooñ). The Point of Sangomar is one of the sacred Serer sites.

Notable Jola people

 , architectural engineer in Senegal.
 Alexander Mendy
 Alioune Badara Faty
 Agostinho Cá
 Baciro Candé
 Bakery Jatta
 Batista Mendy
 Benjamin André
 Charlie Davies
 Dayot Upamecano
 Dion Lopy
 Domingas Togna
 Ebou Adams
 Edelino Ié
 Emiliano Té
 Elhadji Malick Tall
 Ismail Jakobs
 Jules Francois Bocandé, footballer
 Bruma, footballer
 Mamadu Candé
 Mesca
 John Carew, footballer
 Joseph Lopy
 Maixent Coly, Bishop of Ziguinchor (1995–2010)
 Ansu Fati
 Jacques Faty
 Ricardo Faty
 Romain Gall
 Arthur Gómez
 Emmanuel Gómez
 Edgar Ié
 Yahya Jammeh, President of the Gambia (July 1994 to 2017)
 Maudo Jarjué
 Pa Modou Jagne
 Mansa Suling Jatta, King of Kombo (Gambia)
 Joshua King
 Papis Loveday
 Nuha Marong
 Arial Mendy
 Q-Tip (musician), rapper from the band A Tribe Called Quest
 Augustin Sagna, Bishop of Ziguinchor (1966–1995)
 Bacary Sagna, footballer
 Robert Sagna, politician
 Jill Scott, musician
 Lang Tombong Tamba, former army chief of staff of the Gambia
 Sheck Wes
 Opa Sanganté
 Omar Gaye
 Piqueti
Steve Ambri
 Virgil Gomis
 Wilson Manafá
 Zidane Banjaqui
 Oumar Niasse

See also
 La Mulâtresse Solitude
 Musée de la Culture Diola

References

External links

 Les Diolas
 Les jeunes Diola face à l'exode rural
 Diola
Akonting, A West African Ancestor of the Banjo
Banjo Ancestors: The Akonting and Buchundu Folk Lutes 
Folklore and Language materials collected in the 1960s among the Kujamaat Jóola (Diola Fogny)

 
Casamance